Broadwater is an electoral district of the Legislative Assembly in the Australian state of Queensland. It was created at the 1991 redistribution.

The electorate is based on the northern end of the Gold Coast.  It includes South Stradbroke Island as well as Labrador, Paradise Point, Runaway Bay and Sanctuary Cove and Coombabah.

Since 2017 the local member has been David Crisafulli, who is the leader of the Liberal National Party and the state's Opposition Leader.

Members for Broadwater

Election results

References

External links
 Electorate profile (Antony Green, ABC)

Broadwater